Sherborne Castle is a 16th-century Tudor mansion southeast of Sherborne in Dorset, England, within the parish of Castleton. It stands in a  park which formed a small part of the  Digby estate.

Old castle

Sherborne Old Castle is the ruin of a 12th-century castle in the grounds of the mansion. The castle was built as the fortified palace of Roger de Caen, Bishop of Salisbury and Chancellor of England, and still belonged to the church in the late 16th century. In the early 1140s, the castle was captured by Robert Earl of Gloucester during the Anarchy, when it was considered, "the master-key of the whole kingdom".

After passing through Sherborne on the way to Plymouth, Sir Walter Raleigh fell in love with the castle, and Queen Elizabeth relinquished the estate, leasing it to Raleigh in 1592. Rather than refurbish the old castle, Raleigh decided to construct a new lodging for temporary visits, in the compact form for secondary habitations of the nobility and gentry, often architecturally sophisticated, that was known as a lodge. The new house, Sherborne Lodge, was a four-storey, rectangular building completed in 1594. The antiquary John Aubrey remembered it as "a delicate Lodge in the park, of Brick, not big, but very convenient for its bignes, a place to retire from the Court in summer time, and to contemplate, etc." It had four polygonal corner turrets with angled masonry as if they were to serve for military defence, which Nicholas Cooper suggests "may be an obeisance to the old building". Its most progressive feature for its date was the entrance, disguised in one of the corner towers so as not to spoil the apparent symmetry of the facade, which was centred on a rectangular forecourt. The entrance vestibule also contained a winder stairwell and gave directly on the hall.

During Raleigh's imprisonment in the Tower, King James leased the estate to Robert Carr and then sold it to Sir John Digby, 1st Earl of Bristol in 1617. In the 1620s, the Digby family, in order to suit the lodge to a more permanent seat, added four wings to the house in an architectural style similar to the original, retaining the original corner towers.

Civil War
In the Civil War, Sherborne was strongly Royalist, with the castle now owned by Lord Digby, an advisor to the king. The castle was captured by Parliamentarians in September 1642, and recaptured in February 1643. In early August 1645, a New Model Army force under Sir Thomas Fairfax laid siege to the castle, then occupied by a Royalist garrison commanded by Sir Lewis Dyve. Following heavy bombardment and mining, Dyve surrendered the Castle on 17 August 1645. The castle was slighted in October 1645 and left in ruins.

New castle

The name "Sherborne Castle" was then applied to the new house, though today the term Sherborne New Castle is generally used to refer to it, in the same manner as "Sherborne Old Castle" is used for the ruins.

Through the early and mid-18th century William, 5th Lord Digby, who laid out the grounds praised by Alexander Pope, and his heirs Edward, 6th Lord Digby, who inherited in 1752, and Henry, 7th Lord, created Earl Digby, laid out the present castle gardens. Features include the 1753 lake designed by Capability Brown, which separates the old and new castles.  The ruins of the old castle are part of the gardens, being conspicuous amongst the trees across the lake. King George III visited the house and gardens in 1789, shortly before awarding Henry Digby with a peerage. When Edward, 2nd and last Earl Digby, died in 1856 the house was passed to the Wingfield Digby family, who still own the house. The house was modernised by the architect Philip Charles Hardwick.

In the First World War the house was used by the Red Cross as a hospital and in the Second World War as the headquarters for the commandos involved in the D-Day landings.

Listings 
The newer house and the ruins of the old castle were designated as Grade I listed in 1951. Three outbuildings of the house, built in ashlar and stone, are Grade II* listed: the stables (1759, extended early 19th century); the greenhouse (c. 1779); and the dairy (late 18th century).

The gardens are Grade I listed in the National Register of Historic Parks and Gardens.

Today 
The gardens are open to the public much of the year, and the house is open to the public most Saturdays. The estate often hosts special events, such as concerts and firework displays. The old castle was leased by English Heritage and is now separate from the rest of the estate.

See also
 Castles in Great Britain and Ireland
 List of castles in England

Notes

References
Stroud, Dorothy (1975) [1950]. Capability Brown; 2nd revised ed. London: Faber and Faber. . .
Waymark, Janet, "Sherborne, Dorset" Garden History 29.1,  (Summer 2001), pp 64–81.

External links

 Official website
Sherborne Castle Garden - information on garden history
 Sherborne Old Castle at English Heritage

Castles in Dorset
Country houses in Dorset
Gardens in Dorset
Ruins in Dorset
English Heritage sites in Dorset
Grade I listed buildings in Dorset
Grade I listed parks and gardens in Dorset
Historic house museums in Dorset
Gardens by Capability Brown
Ruined castles in England
Sherborne